Princess Theodora of Greece and Denmark may refer to:

 Princess Theodora of Greece and Denmark (1906–1969), the older sister of Prince Philip, Duke of Edinburgh
 Princess Theodora of Greece and Denmark (born 1983), the youngest daughter of former King Constantine II of Greece and Queen Anne-Marie of Greece